Hot Ones is an American YouTube talk show, created by Christopher Schonberger and Sean Evans and produced by First We Feast and Complex Media. Its basic premise involves celebrities being interviewed by Evans over a platter of increasingly spicy chicken wings.  Several spin-offs have been produced, including the game show Hot Ones: The Game Show on the cable television network TruTV, and Truth or Dab, a truth or dare style competition that also airs on the First We Feast YouTube channel.

As of December 2022, the show has produced nineteen seasons (with three seasons per calendar year since 2018).  Most seasons produce between 10 and 16 episodes, though prior to 2018 there were longer seasons consisting of more episodes; approximately 40 episodes air per year. Each season features a different line-up of hot sauces, though certain sauces remain from year-to-year, including three self-produced sauces, "Hot Ones – The Classic" in spot 1, "Hot Ones – Los Calientes" in either spot 4 or 5, and "Hot Ones – The Last Dab" as the final sauce.  Since Season 2, "Da' Bomb Beyond Insanity" has occupied spot 8.  Guests who do not complete the gauntlet of hot sauces are placed in the "Hall of Shame" or, beginning in Season 17, the "Wall-Most Made it."

The show has been nominated for several awards, winning two Streamy Awards and its host, Sean Evans, has been nominated for  Daytime Emmy Award. In 2022, Hot Ones received a nomination for the Daytime Emmy Award for Outstanding Talk Show Entertainment.  The show has been noted for its deep-probing questions, often digging up material from a celebrity's background not often discussed on other interview shows, with Hollywood Insider calling it "the hottest celebrity interview right now" in 2021.

Format
The format involves Evans and his guests eating ten chicken wings (or a vegetarian/vegan alternative based on the guest's preference), each prepared with a progressively hotter hot sauce. Evans states the show's tagline at the beginning of each episode: "The show with hot questions, and even hotter wings."

The first sauce presented is relatively mild such as sriracha, which has a rating of 2,200 Scoville units. The final sauce (as of season 4), Hot Ones' own The Last Dab (The Last Dab Reduxx starting in season 6, and The Last Dab XXX starting in Season 10), has a Scoville rating of 2,000,000+. As per "tradition", the guests are encouraged to put a minuscule extra amount of The Last Dab on the final wing; they are told this is not required, but most guests opt to do so even when already struggling with the heat of the previous wings.

After each wing, Evans asks his guest an interview question. As the wings get hotter, the guest typically begins to display the effects of eating the spicier wings and the interview becomes less focused on the guest and more so the struggle to finish the wings. The guests are also provided glasses of water and milk to counteract the effect of the wings.

The standard show is Evans and one guest eating ten wings each, but in some episodes where there are two guests (such as the episodes featuring Keegan-Michael Key & Jordan Peele and Hila & Ethan Klein from h3h3Productions), only five wings are given to each guest. Guests who successfully finish all ten wings are allowed to promote their upcoming projects. Guests who fail are still afforded this opportunity, but are also added to the show's Hall of Shame.

Development 
The show was created by First We Feast Founder Christopher Schonberger. Schonberger cites Alexa Chung's quirky interview show Popworld as the inspiration for the show. The show is hosted by Sean Evans.

On September 26, 2017, First We Feast featured an episode of Sean in the Wild, using sauces from Hot Ones, starring Sean Evans and Michael Stevens from Vsauce.

The nineteenth episode of the fourth season featuring Mario Batali was originally released on November 23, 2017 and was removed a month later possibly in light of the sexual misconduct allegations towards him.

Series overview

Hot sauce lineup 
Note that the number of sauces was cut in half in earlier seasons when there were multiple guests on the show.

The Scoville units listed below for Season 1 are based on Scott Roberts web Scoville scale whereas the following seasons are based on the units displayed in the episodes, which sometimes results in the same sauce having different ratings in different seasons.

Season 1 lineup

Season 2 lineup

Season 3 lineup

Season 4 lineup

Season 5 lineup

Season 6 lineup

Season 7 lineup

Season 8 lineup

Season 9 lineup

Season 10 lineup

Season 11 lineup

Season 12 lineup

Season 13 lineup

Season 14 lineup

Season 15 lineup

Season 16 lineup

Season 17 lineup

Season 18 lineup

Season 19 lineup

Season 20 lineup

Hall of Shame 
The following is a list of the guests who have failed to eat all ten wings:

 Tony Yayo
 DJ Khaled
 Eddie Huang (first appearance)
 Mike Epps
 Jim Gaffigan
 Rob Corddry
 Ricky Gervais
 Mario Batali
 Taraji P. Henson
 Lil Yachty
 E-40
 Chance the Rapper
 Eric André (second appearance)
 Quavo
 Pusha T
 Shaq

Hot Ones: The Game Show 

On February 18, 2020, a spin-off titled Hot Ones: The Game Show premiered on truTV. Hosted by Evans, the series pits two pairs of players against one another for a chance to win up to $25,000. The main game is played in three rounds, using wings that have been cooked in hot sauces whose Scoville ratings increase from one round to the next. Players are not provided with any water or milk to reduce the effects of the wings but are given buckets in which to vomit if necessary.

In each of the first two rounds, the players begin by eating one wing apiece and the host asks three toss-up questions open to all. The first team to buzz in has five seconds to respond; a correct answer awards them money, while a miss gives it to the opposing team. Questions are worth $100/$200/$300 in the first round, and these values double to $200/$400/$600 for the second.

In the third round, the players begin by eating one bite of a wing. The host reads a series of clues, and players may buzz in at any time to identify the subject being described. Three puzzles are played, worth $1,000/$2,000/$3,000; the team that scores on each puzzle must then take another bite. In this round, if a team misses, the opponents must give the correct answer in order to score. Both teams keep their accumulated winnings.

The higher-scoring team advances to the "Ring of Fire" bonus round, in which each member must drink a shot of mixed hot sauce at the outset that includes a sauce with a Scoville rating of 2 million. One member is then shown a series of words and must get their partner to guess each one by describing it. The clue-giver may pass on a word at any time. If the team can solve five words in 60 seconds, their winnings are increased to $25,000 and they are given large milkshakes to relieve the effects of the sauce and wings they have eaten.

Accolades 

|-
! scope="row" | 2017
| Streamy Award
| Best Food Series
| rowspan="5" |Hot Ones
| 
| 
|-
! scope="row" rowspan="2" | 2018
| Shorty Awards
| Best Web Series
| 
| 
|-
| Streamy Award
| Non-Fiction Series
| 
| 
|-
! scope="row" rowspan="2" | 2019
| rowspan="2" | Streamy Award
| Show of the Year
| 
| 
|-
| Pop Culture
| 
| 
|-
! scope="row" | 2021
| Daytime Emmy Awards
| Outstanding Entertainment Talk Show Host
| Sean Evans
| 
| 
|-
! scope="row" | 2022
| Daytime Emmy Awards
| Outstanding Entertainment Talk Show
| Hot Ones
| 
| 
|}

Note

References

External links 
 

2010s YouTube series
English-language television shows
2015 web series debuts
2010s in food
2020s YouTube series
2020s in food
Shorty Award winners
Streamy Award-winning channels, series or shows